Corby Davidson, (born Corbett Davidson on September 15, 1969) is an American radio personality.

Also known as "The Biggest D-Bag on The Ticket", "The Snake", "The Cobra", and "Friendly Cobra", Davidson co-hosts The Hardline with Bob Sturm on sports radio station KTCK (AM) 1310 The Ticket in Dallas, Texas. The Hardline radio show has won several Dallas Observer Awards for Best Sports Talk Show. Davidson was born in Arlington, Texas, graduated from Lamar High School in Arlington, went to TCU but didn't graduate. In 2000, Davidson married Julie Davidson, and together they have two children, Ike and Van.

References

1969 births
American sports radio personalities
Radio personalities from Dallas
Living people
Lamar High School (Arlington, Texas) alumni